Charles Alvin Hannah (born July 26, 1955) is a former American football offensive guard and defensive end who played in the National Football League from 1977 to 1988. Charley played six years for the Tampa Bay Buccaneers and six years for the Los Angeles Raiders.  He is the son of an NFL player, Herbert (Herb) Hannah, an offensive lineman for the Alabama Crimson Tide, who played a year at tackle for the New York Giants in 1951. His brothers John, a Pro Football Hall of Famer, and David were also All-Conference offensive linemen for the University of Alabama.

Replacing Curt Marsh, Hannah was the starting left guard for the Raiders from 1983 to 1986, but played more sparingly in his final two years. At that position, he opened gaping holes with his linemates against the Washington Redskins, so that Marcus Allen gained a whopping 191 yards on the ground on 20 carries, to help the Raiders win Super Bowl XVIII.

References

External links
 

1955 births
Living people
American football defensive ends
American football offensive guards
Alabama Crimson Tide football players
Los Angeles Raiders players
Tampa Bay Buccaneers players
People from Albertville, Alabama
Players of American football from Georgia (U.S. state)